Cell 16, started by Abby Rockefeller, was a progressive feminist organization active in the United States from 1968 to 1973, known for its program of celibacy, separation from men, and self-defense training (specifically karate). The organization had a journal: No More Fun and Games. Considered too extreme by establishment media, the organization was painted as hard left vanguard.

History
In the summer of 1968, Roxanne Dunbar placed an advertisement in a Boston, Massachusetts, underground newspaper calling for a "Female Liberation Front". The original membership also included Hillary Langhorst, Sandy Bernard, Dana Densmore, the daughter of Donna Allen, Betsy Warrior, Ellen O'Donnell, Jayne West, Mary Anne Weathers, Maureen Maynes, Gail Murray, and Abby Rockefeller. The group's name was meant "to emphasize that they were only one cell of an organic movement" and referenced the address of their meetings – 16 Lexington Avenue.

No More Fun and Games ceased publication in 1973. Cell 16 disbanded in 1973 as well.

Ideology
Founded in 1968 by Roxanne Dunbar, Cell 16 has been cited as the first organization to advance the concept of separatist feminism. Cultural historian Alice Echols cites Cell 16 as an example of feminist heterosexual separatism, as the group never advocated lesbianism as a political strategy. Echols credits Cell 16's work for "helping establishing the theoretical foundation for lesbian separatism. In No More Fun and Games, the organization's journal, Roxanne Dunbar and Lisa Leghorn advised women to "separate from men who are not consciously working for female liberation", and advised periods of celibacy, rather than lesbian relationships, which some lesbian groups labeled as "nothing more than a personal solution".

References

External links
 Pearson, Kyra, Mapping rhetorical interventions in "national" feminist histories: Second wave feminism and Ain't I a Woman (1999) (abstract)
 Duke University has digitized vol. 1, no. 2, of the journal "No More Fun and Games"

Further reading 
 The Female state. Cambridge, Massachusetts : Cell 16. (1970) OCLC 478356868

1968 establishments in Massachusetts
1973 disestablishments in Massachusetts
Women's political advocacy groups in the United States
Celibacy
Feminism and sexuality
Feminist organizations in the United States
Organizations established in 1968
Radical feminist organizations
History of women in Massachusetts
Organizations disestablished in 1973